Earthdawn Companion is a supplement published by FASA in 1994 for the fantasy role-playing game Earthdawn.

Contents
Earthdawn Companion is a 168-page softcover book designed by Greg Gordon and Louis J. Prosperi, with additional material by Christopher Kubasik and Allen Varney, and illustrations by Janet Aulisio, Joel Biske, Steve Bryant, Earl Geier, Jeff Laubenstein, Larry MacDougal], Darrell Midgette, Robert Nelson, Mike Neilsen, Tony Szczudlo, and Karl Waller. 

The book adds rules to the first edition of Earthdawn for characters of the 9th through 15th Circles, supplementary rules regarding magic and spells, rules for designing new disciplines and creatures, and rules for ship-to-ship combat. There are also optional rules for combat, talents and abilities, and Supporters.

For each of the second, third and fourth editions of Earthdawn, FASA published an updated Companion book.

Reception
In the October 1994 edition of Dragon (Issue #210), Rick Swan did question the addition of even more content for the already complex game magic, pointing out that "the last thing the convoluted magic system needed was more rules." But overall, Swan thought the book was "a must for hardcore Earthdawn gamers."

Reviews
White Wolf Magazine #46 (Aug., 1994)
Backstab #4

References

Earthdawn supplements
Role-playing game supplements introduced in 1994